Kelby Pickering (born 3 January 1976) is an Australian cricketer. He played in one first-class and three List A matches for South Australia in 1997/98. After his career in Australia, Pickering played cricket in Liverpool, England during the late 1990s and early 2000s, and for Forfarshire Cricket Club in Dundee, Scotland in 2010.

See also
 List of South Australian representative cricketers

References

External links
 

1976 births
Living people
Australian cricketers
South Australia cricketers
Cricketers from Adelaide